Boulevard Utara Station (also known as Kelapa Gading Station) is a light rail station of the Jakarta LRT Line A. The station is located at East Kelapa Gading, Kelapa Gading, North Jakarta.

The station is one of the six stations of the first phase of Jakarta LRT Line A which opened on 1 December 2019. The station is also connected with Mal Kelapa Gading (MKG) where MKG also provides park and ride facilities for LRT passengers.

Services

Places nearby 
 Summarecon Mall Kelapa Gading
 La Piazza
 Gading Walk
 Menara Satu Sentra Kelapa Gading
 Gading Food City
 Al-Musyawarah Mosque

Gallery

References

North Jakarta
Jakarta LRT stations
Railway stations opened in 2019